A block diagram is a diagram of a system in which the principal parts or functions are represented by blocks connected by lines that show the relationships of the blocks. They are heavily used in engineering in hardware design, electronic design, software design, and process flow diagrams.

Block diagrams are typically used for higher level, less detailed descriptions that are intended to clarify overall concepts without concern for the details of implementation. Contrast this with the schematic diagrams and layout diagrams used in electrical engineering, which show the implementation details of electrical components and physical construction.

Usage 
As an example, a block diagram of a radio is not expected to show each and every connection and dial and switch, but the schematic diagram is. The schematic diagram of a radio does not show the width of each connection in the printed circuit board, but the layout does.

To make an analogy to the map making world, a block diagram is similar to a highway map of an entire nation.  The major cities (functions) are listed but the minor county roads and city streets are not. When troubleshooting, this high level map is useful in narrowing down and isolating where a problem or fault is.

Block diagrams rely on the principle of the black box where the contents are hidden from view either to avoid being distracted by the details or because the details are not known. We know what goes in, we know what goes out, but we can't see how the box does its work.

In electrical engineering, a design will often begin as a very high level block diagram, becoming more and more detailed block diagrams as the design progresses, finally ending in block diagrams detailed enough that each individual block can be easily implemented (at which point the block diagram is also a schematic diagram). This is known as top down design. Geometric shapes are often used in the diagram to aid interpretation and clarify meaning of the process or model. The geometric shapes are connected by lines to indicate association and direction/order of traversal. Each engineering discipline has their own meaning for each shape. Block diagrams are used in every discipline of engineering. They are also a valuable source of concept building and educationally beneficial in non-engineering disciplines.

In process control, block diagrams are a visual language for describing actions in a complex system in which blocks are black boxes that represent mathematical or logical operations that occur in sequence from left to right and top to bottom, but not the physical entities, such as processors or relays, that perform those operations. It is possible to create such block diagrams and implement their functionality with specialized programmable logic controller (PLC) programming languages.

In biology there is an increasing use of engineering principles, techniques of analysis and methods of diagramming. There is some similarity between the block diagram and what is called Systems Biology Graphical Notation. As it is there is use made in systems biology of the block diagram technique harnessed by control engineering where the latter is itself an application of control theory.
 
An example of this is the function block diagram, one of five programming languages defined in part 3 of the IEC 61131 (see IEC 61131-3) standard that is highly formalized (see formal system), with strict rules for how diagrams are to be built. Directed lines are used to connect input variables to block inputs, and block outputs to output variables and inputs of other blocks.

See also 
 Black box
 Bond graph
 Data flow diagram
 Functional flow block diagram
 One-line diagram
 Reliability block diagram
 Schematic diagram
 Signal-flow graph

References

External links 

Diagrams
Modeling languages